The Ponce Jazz Festival is a musical celebration that takes place every year in Ponce, Puerto Rico.

History 
The festival is one of the newest in the Western Hemisphere. It was inaugurated in 2012. It takes place at the Concha Acustica (English: acoustical shell) Amphitheatre of Parque de la Abolición in Barrio Cuarto.

List of events

2012 edition 
The festival starts on the last Friday of April, and the 2012 events were as follows:

Friday 27 April 2012
Grupo Zambaríbiri Stage Band (Guayanilla)
Escuela de Música de Guayama
Grupo Sound Jazz y Jazz Jam

Saturday 28 April 2012
Edwin Gutiérrez & Jazz Project
Charlie Sepúlveda & The Turnaround Band  
Julito Alvarado and his group Del Sur al Norte

Sunday 29 April 2012
Eugenio Torres & Sol Creciente 
Banda Municipal de Ponce, Carlos Juan Colón & Manus, and William Cepeda

2013 edition 
The 2013 events were as follows.

Friday, 26 April 2013
Stage Band - Instituto de Musica Juan Morel Campos
Diversis Quartet
Flautista Joche Caraballo and his Trio
Irvin Cancel and his Band

Saturday, 27 April 2013
Luis Gonzalez & his Orchestra
Joseito Ruiz & Quartet
PuertoSax

Sunday, 29 April 2013
Black Jazz
Master Jazz Big Band

See also 
 Carnaval de Ponce 
 Feria de Artesanías de Ponce
 Fiesta Nacional de la Danza
 Día Mundial de Ponce
 Festival Nacional de la Quenepa
 Bienal de Arte de Ponce
 Festival de Bomba y Plena de San Antón
 Carnaval de Vejigantes
 Festival Nacional Afrocaribeño

References

External links
 The 2013 Edition of PJF, YouTube video.

Carnivals in Puerto Rico
April events
Annual events in Puerto Rico
Festivals in Ponce, Puerto Rico
2012 establishments in Puerto Rico
Jazz festivals in Puerto Rico
Music festivals established in 2012